Dora Dlamini (died 9 June 2020) was a South African politician from KwaZulu-Natal. A member of South Africa's governing party, the African National Congress, she served as a Member of the National Assembly of South Africa from 2019 until her death aged 57 in 2020 from COVID-19.

References

20th-century births
2020 deaths
Xhosa people
People from KwaZulu-Natal
21st-century South African politicians
African National Congress politicians
Members of the National Assembly of South Africa
Women members of the National Assembly of South Africa
Deaths from the COVID-19 pandemic in South Africa